Okanagan-Westside was a provincial electoral district for the Legislative Assembly of British Columbia, Canada from 2001 to 2009.

It included the small cities of Westbank, Westside, Peachland, and Summerland, and extended from the city limit of Summerland (in the south) to the Okanagan Lake bridge, in Westside (north). Kelowna, the major city in the Okanagan, lies across the Okanagan Lake bridge. Encompassing land in both the South and Central Okanagan, this constituency's lands are well known for their semi-arid climate and high summer temperatures..

Demographics

Geography

History 
The area of this constituency was first settled in the late 19th and early 20th centuries by European agriculturalists. Fruit growing, especially apple and cherry crops, were a major industry, although tourism, logging, mining, and now viticulture, have also been major industries in the region. The Okanogan peoples, an Interior Salish language group, have settled the area for several thousand years.

1999 Redistribution
This electoral district was carved out of Okanagan West, Okanagan-Vernon and Okanagan-Penticton.

2008 Redistribution
The electoral district was abolished in 2008 into Westside-Kelowna, Penticton and Fraser-Nicola.

MLAs 
Rick Thorpe, Liberal (2001–2009)

Election results

References

External links 
BC Stats Profile - 2001
Results of 2001 election (pdf)
2001 Expenditures
Website of the Legislative Assembly of British Columbia

Former provincial electoral districts of British Columbia